HMS C8 was one of 38 C-class submarines built for the Royal Navy in the first decade of the 20th century. The boat survived the First World War and was sold for scrap in 1920.

Design and description
The C class was essentially a repeat of the preceding B class, albeit with better performance underwater. They displaced  on the surface and  submerged. The C-class submarines had a crew of two officers and fourteen ratings.

For surface running, the boats were powered by a single 16-cylinder  Vickers petrol engine that drove one propeller shaft. When submerged the propeller was driven by a  electric motor. They could reach  on the surface and  underwater.

The boats were armed with two 18-inch (45 cm) torpedo tubes in the bow. They could carry a pair of reload torpedoes, but generally did not as they would have to remove an equal weight of fuel in compensation.

Construction and career
C8 was laid down on 9 December 1905 by Vickers at their Barrow-in-Furness shipyard, launched on 15 February 1907 and completed on 23 May.

In 1910 C8 was part of the Nore Submarine Flotilla. On 16 December 1910 the flotilla, including C8 was leaving Harwich harbour when C8 collided with the tender , which was carrying sailors back to the depot ship . Elfin sank with the loss of five men. During World War I, the boat was generally used for coastal defence and training. C8 was sold for scrap on 22 October 1920.

Notes

References
 
 
 
 

 

British C-class submarines
Ships built in Barrow-in-Furness
Royal Navy ship names
1907 ships
Maritime incidents in 1910
British submarine accidents